Route 127 is an East/West provincial highway in the Canadian province of New Brunswick. The Highway starts out in Lawrence Station at the intersection of Route 3 The road travels mainly south for almost 60 km through mostly rural communities. The road does pass Rickets Island and runs along the Canada/US border as is the main route into St. Andrews where the road name changes to Bayview Drive and Mowat Drive. In St. Andrews the highway takes a sharp almost U-Turn before finally ending in the community of Bocabec.

History

Route 127 was commissioned in 1965 as a short loop off Route 1 into St. Andrews. (Route 1 at that point followed the eastern shore of the St. Croix River as far as Ghost Road in Bayside, then crossed over to the east side of the peninsula to go north along Passamaquoddy Bay.) When a new alignment of Route 1 opened in 1973 between Waweig and Digdeguash, Route 127 was extended along the bypassed segments of Route 1. It was extended further north to Lawrence Station in 1984 when Route 765 was decommissioned.

Intersecting routes
 Route 770 in Leverville
Route 760 in Waweig
Route 1 in Gilmans Corner
Route 170 in Gilmans Corner
Route 1 in Digedguash

River crossings
 Digdeguash River in Dumbarton
 (unknown river) south of Waweig
 Bocabec River in Bocabec

Communities along the Route
Watt
Dumbarton
Greenock
Leverville
Waweig
Gilmans Corner
Bayside
Wileys Corner
St. Andrews
Edwards Corner
Chamcook Lake
Bocabec Cove

See also
List of New Brunswick provincial highways

References

127
127